Known as the Crann Tara in Gaelic, the burning cross represented a signal fire, a method of communication among the clans and the rallying symbol of ancient Scotland and of the Highlanders in times of war.

Fiery Cross or The Fiery Cross may also refer to:
Fiery cross (bidding stick), a term used in early Scotland for burning a piece of wood as a beacon
Fiery Cross (clipper), a sailing ship
The Fiery Cross (novel), a novel by Diana Gabaldon in the Outlander series
 The Fiery Cross, an 1889 cantata by Max Bruch.
The Fiery Cross (newsletter), a defunct newsletter of the United Klans of America
Heroes of the Fiery Cross, a pro-Klan book published in 1928 by Alma Bridwell White 
Fiery Cross Reef, a group of three reefs on the western edge of Dangerous Ground in the Spratly Islands of the South China Sea

See also
Cross burning, a practice associated in modern times with the Ku Klux Klan